The 1920 Oregon Webfoots football team represented the University of Oregon in the Pacific Coast Conference (PCC) during the 1920 college football season.  In their third season under head coach Charles A. Huntington, the Webfoots compiled a 3–2–1 record (1–1–1 against PCC opponents), shut out three of six opponents, finished in third place in the PCC, and were outscored by their opponents, 38 to 37. The team played its home games at Hayward Field in Eugene, Oregon.

Schedule

References

Oregon
Oregon Ducks football seasons
Oregon Webfoots football